The Weardale Railway is an independently-owned British single-track branch line heritage railway between , Witton-le-Wear, Wolsingham, Frosterley and Stanhope. Weardale Railway began services on 23 May 2010, but decided to run special trains rather than a scheduled service for the 2013 season. The line was purchased by the Auckland Project in 2020 with a view to restarting passenger services. In 2021, a bid was submitted to the 'Restoring Your Railways fund. In October 2021, the Department for Transport allocated funding for the development of a business case.

Passenger services ceased in 1953, leaving only freight services to Eastgate until 1992.

After the quarry's owner Lafarge moved to road transport in 1993, the line was threatened with closure by British Rail (BR), and it was taken over by a group of enthusiasts.

Background

 gained its first rail link in 1842, when the Stockton and Darlington Railway (S&DR) backed Bishop Auckland and Weardale Railway (BA&WR) gained the powers via an Act of Parliament to build a railway line from the S&DR's station at  via Bishop Auckland and Witton-le-Wear into Crook, County Durham. The BA&WR initially built a temporary terminus at South Church, which opened on 19 April 1842. After completion of the Shildon tunnel, the BA&WR erected a permanent station on the current site, which opened to freight on 8 November 1843, and passengers on 30 January 1843. All operations were sub-leased as agreed to the S&DR.

In 1845, the S&DR came to an agreement with the Derwent Iron Company to sub-lease the southern section of the former Stanhope and Tyne Railway. That line was opened as the Weardale Extension Railway (WXR).

With all works again undertaken by the S&DR, this line opened on 3 August 1847. After these works had been completed, the BA&WR amalgamated with the WXR. All service were operated by the S&DR, which officially took over the new company in January 1857.

The final extension of the Weardale Railway to  opened on 21 October 1895. Between Eastgate and Westgate at Cambo Keels, sidings were established to serve the Weardale Iron Company's Heights limestone quarry, which is still in operation today.

Decline and closure
As elsewhere the UK, rail traffic in the area declined after World War II, with the Wearhead branch the first to lose its passenger trains in 1953. The principal closures came in the 1960s, post the Beeching Axe. Services to Barnard Castle via West Auckland ended in 1962, those to Durham in 1964, and to Crook in 1965. That left only the former original S&DR line to  line in operation, along with the freight-only branch traffic to Eastgate.

Durham County Council recognised the value of the line to leisure services by 1983 when, with the patronage of David Bellamy, intermittent specials began to serve Stanhope again under the banner of "The Heritage Line", because of the S&DR association. This became a scheduled weekend-only summer service, printed in BR public timetables, between 23 May 1988 and 27 September 1992. Etherley, otherwise known as Witton Park Station, was re-opened on 21 August 1991. It has not re-opened under the post 2010 Weardale Railway operation.

In March 1993, Lafarge decided to service the Eastgate cement works by road and end its use of rail. British Rail then announced its intention to close the line due to the loss of revenue. Local authorities sought another use for the line and considered that the only immediate possibility was a steam-hauled tourist service.

Formation of Weardale Railway Trust

The Weardale Railway preservation project was founded in 1993, with the intention that a private company should take ownership of the line and start a steam service for tourists on the scenic western section. The operating company was known as the Weardale Railways Ltd, a company limited by guarantee.

The Weardale Railway Trust (WRT) is a voluntary group whose members are supporters of the project. WRT was initially just a "supporters' club" but it assumed a more prominent role as Weardale Railways Ltd got into difficulties. In 2006 WRT took a 12.5% minority stake in the ownership of Weardale Railways Ltd.

Large sums of public sector grant finance were obtained or conditionally pledged from various donors including the Regional development agency (One NorthEast), Durham County Council and the Wear Valley District Council. The Manpower Services Commission contributed to the wages of paid staff in what had become an area of high unemployment, and this allowed a 40-strong workforce to be recruited, a depot and base of operations to be established at Wolsingham and the station at Stanhope to be restored.  Services started in July 2004, initially from Wolsingham to Stanhope but with the intention of extending them along the full length of the remaining line. There were even plans to rebuild the Eastgate to Wearhead section which had been lifted.

Eventually, a community interest company known as Ealing Community Transport agreed to pay £100,000 for a 75% stake in Weardale Railways Ltd and provide management support to the project. Ealing Community Transport also agreed to underwrite any further operating losses incurred by Weardale Railways Ltd. This undertaking was sufficient to allow the creditors of Weardale Railways Ltd to permit the resumption of limited services on the line in August 2006.

British American Railway Services

In September 2008, Ealing Community Transport's 75% interest in WRC was transferred to British American Railway Services, a wholly owned subsidiary of US private company Iowa Pacific Holdings. Ed Ellis, the spokesman for these firms, visited the Weardale Railway in October 2008, and announced an intention to reopen the line to Bishop Auckland by the end of 2008.

In October 2008, the line's paid staff and volunteers undertook the "Brush Blitz" to clear 14 years of vegetation growth from the track between Wolsingham and Bishop Auckland. After two damaged sections of track were repaired, in early 2009 a passenger-carrying Wickham trolley (light rail vehicle) was able to negotiate the line from Wolsingham to within sight of Bishop Auckland station. Ellis also announced plans to build a rail freight terminal at Eastgate for the loading of aggregates from local quarries together with other freight, including mineral, food and agricultural commodities.

On 27 March 2009 the railway's website reported that Network Rail had undertaken to re-install missing points and crossings at Bishop Auckland to reconnect the Weardale Line with the national rail network. It was stated that this would be done before 31 July 2009. Network Rail completed the connection in early September 2009. On 29 September 2009, the development of the Eastgate Renewable Energy Village received unanimous outline approval by the County Durham strategic planning committee, thus providing a potential boost to the line's future prospects. By 2013 this project appeared stalled.

In December 2009, it was announced that UK Coal was interested in using the line to transport coal from an opencast (open pit) coal mine in the line's catchment area and that local quarry owners had been approached about the possibility of shipping aggregates along the line.  This is intended to ensure the future of the line as a viable business.

In February 2020, Iowa-Pacific, the parent company of British American Railway Services, announced their intention to sell the line. It was purchased in March 2020 by the Auckland Project, a County Durham charity.

Operations

On 25 January 2010, Her Majesty's Railway Inspectorate travelled on the Weardale line checking bridges, fences and crossings along the 18-mile stretch between Stanhope and Bishop Auckland. In February 2010, this became the first mainline passenger service to travel the line since the 1980s. It was followed on 27 February by a railtour from Crewe to Stanhope, operated by Spitfire Railtours.

Regular passenger services to Bishop Auckland started on 23 May 2010, but for the 2013 season a scheduled service was not offered, the railway instead offering themed operations, such as Dine and Ride and the Polar Express.
Since 2014, the Railway Trust has operated passenger trains on selected weekdays and weekends for mostly tourist traffic using a Class 122 "Bubble Car". Initially, this only ran between Wolsingham and Stanhope but, on 27 March 2016, this service was extended to Witton-le-Wear. Once the works were completed it was intended to reinstate the tracks and extend the Stanhope to Witton-le-Wear passenger service back to Bishop Auckland West station. Since July 2018, two of the three daily return services between Stanhope and Witton-le-Wear now continue to Bishop Auckland West station.

After receiving planning permission to load opencast coal, mined in the Crook area, alterations and arrangements were made to the Weardale Railway Depot at Wolsingham, to receive and transship the coal from road to rail.  The first loaded coal train left Wolsingham on 16 June 2011 bound for steel works in Scunthorpe.  Later, services were extended to include the power station at Ratcliffe On Soar, near Nottingham. This became a five-train-a-week operation that operated until 2 October 2013, and halted as a result of the financial collapse of UK Coal, following the spoil tip landslip that destroyed the connecting railway at Hatfield Colliery in February 2013, preventing coal shipments, and the underground fire at Daw Mill Colliery the following month which plunged UK Coal into financial crisis.

Stations of the Weardale Railway

 Westgate-In-Weardale Station (Planned)
 Eastgate-In-Weardale Station (Planned)
 Stanhope Station
 Frosterley Station
 Kingfisher Leisure Park Halt 
 Wolsingham Station 
 Harperley Station (Currently Disused)
 Witton-le-Wear (Re-opened, Easter 2016) (Current Terminus)
 Wear Valley Junction (Currently Disused)
 Etherley (Currently Disused, the railway plans to re-open it as Witton Park)
 Bishop Auckland West Station (not in regular use 2012–2018; reopened during gala in April 2018 and regular services reintroduced in July 2018)

Rolling stock

Steam Locomotives
 N.C.B. 40, Robert Stephenson & Hawthorns  (7765 of 1954). Under overhaul.

Diesel Locomotives
 BR Class 31 no. 31190 (moved to Plym Valley Railway 2021 )
 BR Class 31 no. 31285 (operational)
 BR Class 31 no. 31454 (now moved to Wensleydale Railway)
 BR Class 31 no. 31459 (operational)
 BR Class 31 no. 31465 (operational)

Diesel Multiple Units
 BR Class 108 nos. 50980 + 52054 (operational)
 BR Class 122 no. E55012 (operational)

Former residents Class 31 Nos. 31144 (spares), Class 31 31468 (spares) and 31602 (spares), Class 141 Nos. 141103 and 141110 (spares) have since been scrapped.

Notes

References

External links

 The Weardale Railway project website
 The Weardale Railway Locomotive Preservation Group
 Iowa Pacific Holdings website
 Westgate station with links to articles on other Weardale stations

Heritage railways in County Durham
History of County Durham
Stockton and Darlington Railway
North Eastern Railway (UK)
John Middleton railway stations